The Yongle Encyclopedia or Yongle Dadian is a largely-lost Chinese leishu encyclopedia commissioned by the Yongle Emperor of the Ming dynasty in 1403 and completed by 1408. It comprised 22,937 manuscript rolls or chapters, in 11,095 volumes. Fewer than 400 volumes survive today, comprising about 800 chapters (rolls), or 3.5 percent of the original work. 

Most of it was lost in the 2nd half of the 19th century, in the midst of events as Second Opium War, the Boxer Rebellion and subsequent social unrests. Its sheer scope and size made it the world's largest general encyclopedia until it was surpassed by Wikipedia in late 2007, nearly six centuries later.

Background
Although known for his military achievements, the Yongle Emperor was an intellectual who enjoyed reading. His love for research led him to develop the idea of categorizing literary works into a reference encyclopedia to preserve rare books and simplify research. Instrumental to this undertaking was Emperor Yongle’s own changes to the function of the Hanlin Academy. 

Prior to his reign, the Hanlin Academy was responsible for various clerical tasks such as drafting proclamations and edicts. Emperor Yongle decided to elevate the status of the Hanlin Academy and began selecting only the highest-ranking recruits for the academy. Clerical duties were relegated to Imperial officers, whereas the Hanlin Academy, now full of elite scholars, began to work on literary projects for the Emperor.

Development
The Yongle Dadian was commissioned by the Yongle Emperor (r. 1402–1424) and completed in 1408. In 1404, a year after the work was commissioned, a team of 100 scholars, mostly from the Hanlin Academy, completed a manuscript called A Complete Work of Literature. Emperor Yongle rejected this work and insisted on adding other volumes. 

In 1405, under Emperor Yongle’s command, the number of scholars rose to 2,169. Scholars were sent all over China to find books and expand the encyclopedia. Emperor Yongle assigned his personal advisor, Dao Yan, a monk, and Liu Jichi, the deputy minister of punishment, as co-editors of the encyclopedia, supporting Yao Guangxiao. The scholars spent four years compiling the leishu encyclopedia, under the leadership of general editor Yao Guangxiao.

The encyclopedia was completed in 1408 at the Guozijian in Nanjing (now Nanjing University).

It was designed to include all that had been written on the Confucian canon, as well as all history, philosophy, arts and sciences. It was a massive collation of excerpts and works from the entirety of Chinese literature and knowledge. Emperor Yongle was so pleased with the finished encyclopedia, that he named it after his reign, and personally wrote a lengthy preface highlighting the importance of preserving the works.

Style
The encyclopedia's physical appearance differed from any other Chinese encyclopedias of the time. It was larger in size, used special paper, and was bound in a "wrapped back" (bao bei zhuang) style. The use of red ink for titles and authors, an ink exclusively reserved for the emperor, helped to confirm that the volumes were of royal production. 

Each volume was protected by a hard-cover which was wrapped in yellow silk. The use of this system helped the reader find specific entries with ease. 

Although book printing already existed in the Ming Dynasty, the Yongle Encyclopedia was exclusively handwritten. Each handwritten entry was a collection of existing literature, some of which derived from rare and delicate texts. The importance of the Yongle Encyclopedia was the preservation of such texts, and the vast number of subjects it covered.

Reception 
At the end of the Ming dynasty, scholars began to question the Yongle Emperor's motives for not commissioning more copies of the encyclopedia, instead of keeping them in storage. Some scholars, like Sun Chengze, a Qing scholar, theorized that Emperor Yongle used the literary project for political reasons. At the time, Neo-Confucians were refusing to take civil service exams, or participate in any imperial duties, due to the Yongle Emperor's violent usurpation of the throne. The Yongle Emperor's literary undertaking did attract the attention of these scholars, who eventually joined the project. 

Because the Yongle Emperor did not want a strictly Confucian point of view for the encyclopedia, non-Confucian scholars were also included, and contributed to the Buddhist, Daoist, and Divination sections of the encyclopedia. The inclusion of these subjects intensified the scrutiny against the Yongle Emperor amongst Neo-Confucians who believed the encyclopedia was nothing but "wheat and chaff". However, despite the varied opinions, the encyclopedia is widely regarded as a priceless contribution in preserving a wide range of China's historic works, many of which would be lost otherwise.

Disappearance
The Yongle Dadian was not printed for the general public because the treasury had run out of funds when it was completed in 1408. It was placed in Wenyuan Ge in Nanjing until 1421, when the Yongle Emperor moved the capital to Beijing and placed the Yongle Dadian in the Forbidden City. In 1557, during the reign of the Jiajing Emperor, the encyclopedia was narrowly saved from a fire that burnt down three palaces in the Forbidden City. A manuscript copy was commissioned by Jiajing Emperor in 1562 and completed in 1567. The original copy was lost afterwards. There are three major hypotheses for its disappearance, but no conclusion was made:

Destroyed in late Ming dynasty. Li Zicheng, rebel leader, in 1644 overthrew the Ming dynasty and took over the Ming capital, Beijing. A few months later, he was defeated by the coalition of Wu Sangui and Dorgon. Li burned the Forbidden City when he withdrew from Beijing. The Yongle Dadian may have been destroyed in the fire.
Buried with Jiajing Emperor. The time when the Jiajing Emperor was buried was very close to the time of completion of the manuscript copy. Jiajing Emperor died in December 1566, but was buried three months later, in March 1567. One possibility is that they were waiting for the manuscript to be completed.
Burned in the Qianqing Palace fire.

The original manuscript of the Yongle Dadian was almost completely lost by the end of the Ming dynasty. 90 percent of the 1567 manuscript survived until the Second Opium War during the Qing dynasty. In 1860, the Anglo-French invasion of Beijing resulted in the majority of the encyclopedia being burnt or looted, with British and French soldiers taking large portions of the manuscript as souvenirs. 

5,000 volumes remained by 1875, less than half of the original, which dwindled to 800 by 1894. During the Boxer Rebellion and the 1900 Eight-Nation Alliance occupation of Beijing, allied soldiers took hundreds of volumes, and many were destroyed in the Hanlin Academy fire. Only 60 volumes remained in Beijing.

Current status
The most complete collection is kept at the National Library of China in Beijing, which holds 221 volumes. The next largest collection is at the National Palace Museum in Taipei, which holds 62 volumes.

Sections of the Yongle Encyclopedia (sections 10,270 and 10,271) reside at the Huntington Library in San Marino, California.

51 volumes are in the United Kingdom held at the British Library, the Bodleian Library in Oxford, the School of Oriental and African Studies of the University of London, and Cambridge University Library; the Library of Congress of the United States holds 41 volumes; Cornell University Library has 6 volumes; and 5 volumes are held in various libraries in Germany.

Two volumes were sold at a Paris auction on July 7, 2020, for more than €8 million (US$9 million).

See also
 Chinese encyclopedia
 Four Great Books of Song
 Gujin Tushu Jicheng
 List of most expensive books and manuscripts
 Siku Quanshu

References

Citations

Sources 

 Ebrey, Patricia Buckley, Anne Walthall, James B. Palais. (2006). East Asia: A Cultural, Social, and Political History. Boston: Houghton Mifflin Company. .
 Guo Bogong. Yongle dadian kao . Shanghai: Commercial Press, 1937.

External links

Digitized chapters of the Encyclopedia:
221 chapters held by the National Library of China in Beijing (online via the World Digital Library)
49 chapters held by the British Library in London
9 chapters held by the Chester Beatty Library in Dublin

China to Digitalize World's Earliest Encyclopedia. People's Daily Online. April 2002 - aspirations, pending approval.
Biggest and Earliest Encyclopedia. chinaculture.org.
Experts Urge Collectors To Share World's Earliest Encyclopedia. china.org.cn. April 2002.

1408 books
Chinese encyclopedias
Ming dynasty literature
Lost books
Leishu
Yongle Emperor